Kadamalaigundu - Mayiladumparai is a Panchayat union of Theni Revenue district in the state of Tamil Nadu.

Education
G R Varatharajulu Higher Secondary School

Villages
Following is the list of Village Panchayats that come under this union 

 Athankaraipatti
 Duraichamipuram
 Ettapparajapuram
 Gandamanur
 Kadamalaikundu
 Kumananthozhu
 Manthisunai moolakadai
 Megamalai
 Murukkodai
 Muthalamparai
 Myladumparai (also known as Mayiladumparai)
 Nariyuthu
 Paaluthu
 Ponnanpadugai
 Singarajapuram
 Thangammalpuram
 Thummakundu
 Varusanadu

References

Theni district